Viktoria Wolffhardt (born 26 June 1994 in Tulln an der Donau) is an Austrian slalom canoeist who has competed at the international level since 2009.

She won three medals at the ICF Canoe Slalom World Championships with two silvers (K1 team: 2014, 2017) and a bronze (C1 team: 2015). She also won a gold, three silvers and two bronzes at the European Championships.

She competed at the 2010 Summer Youth Olympics where she won bronze in the K1 slalom event.

She represented Austria at the 2020 Summer Olympics in Tokyo, finishing 11th in the K1 event after being eliminated in the semifinal.

World Cup individual podiums

References

External links

Austrian female canoeists
Living people
1994 births
Canoeists at the 2010 Summer Youth Olympics
People from Tulln an der Donau
Medalists at the ICF Canoe Slalom World Championships
Canoeists at the 2020 Summer Olympics
Olympic canoeists of Austria